The Brantford NISSAN Classic is a curling tournament or bonspiel part of the men's and women's curling tour. The event existed exclusively on the Ontario Curling Tour until 2017, before it was added as a WCT event for 2018 and 2019. The event is an annual event held at the end of November and the beginning of December. The event took place at the Brant Curling Club in Brantford, Ontario until 2017. It was moved to the Paris Curling Club in Paris, Ontario in 2018 and then the Brantford Golf & Country Club for 2022.

A women's event was held in 2016 and did not return until 2022.

Previous names:
2004–2016: Brantford NISSAN Classic 
2017: Brantford NISSAN Men's Classic
2018: NISSAN Curling Classic
2019: Brantford NISSAN Classic
2021–present: Stu Sells Brantford NISSAN Classic

Past Champions
Only skip's name is displayed.

Men

Women

References

External links
2012 Event Site

Ontario Curling Tour events
Sport in Brantford